St Edward's Church, Sanday, is a deconsecrated, and now disused church on the small isle of Sanday, Inner Hebrides, Scotland.

The church was a gift to the people of Canna and Sanday from Gwendolyn Fitzalan-Howard, the 3rd Marchioness of Bute, who had it erected as a memorial to her father, Edward Fitzalan-Howard, 1st Baron Howard of Glossop, who had died in 1883. At the time, the islands were owned by the Thom family, though permission was willingly given by them, despite the fact that they were not Catholics, and would later build the Protestant St Columba's Church on Canna in 1912. Designed by William Frame, who was architect to the Butes, St Edward's was built between 1886 and 1890. The corbel course in the  nave was supplied by Thomas Nicholls. Both of these men would later work on now-famous buildings in Cardiff, where the Marquess owned Cardiff Castle; the most prominent examples being the Pierhead Building, Castell Coch and the Animal Wall. After St Edward's was built, the old church was converted into a shop and post office.

The populations of Sanday and Canna declined during the 20th Century, with their combined inhabitants now numbering around 30. In the face of this loss of parishioners, the church began to suffer from structural deterioration and closed in 1963. Services have now been moved back into the old St Columba's chapel on Canna (a replacement post office was built nearby). The former church received Listed status in 1985.

After closure, the church was used as a hostelry, and in 2001, was converted into a Gaelic study centre at the cost of £860,000. This was not a successful venture, as it was reported in 2010 that the centre had never been used, and was once again suffering from water damage. By 2016, it was once again disused.

Gallery

References

Roman Catholic churches completed in 1890
Former Roman Catholic churches in Scotland
Canna, Scotland
19th-century Roman Catholic church buildings in the United Kingdom